Jim Donnelly (born 13 June 1946) is a Scottish former professional snooker player who now coaches. He was seeded 29th in the world rankings for the 1982–1983 season. He played in the 1982 World Snooker Championship at the Crucible Theatre, the first Scottish professional player to do so, where he was eliminated in the first round in a match against Ray Reardon. He also reached the final of the 1987 Scottish Professional Championship, where he was defeated by a young Stephen Hendry.

Donnelly is now using his skills in snooker to provide snooker coaching lessons to people of all ages. Donnelly has pioneered the Scottish game being the first Scot to compete at the crucible and as a coach, coaching the likes of John Higgins, Alan McManus and many of the top Scottish Junior players.

References

External links
 Jim Donnelly – Professional Snooker Tuition

Scottish snooker players
Living people
1946 births
Sportspeople from Edinburgh